Big Mama is a South Korean female vocal group that debuted in 2003. The group is known for focusing on its members' singing abilities rather than their looks. The group disbanded in 2012 after their last song "Cleaning My Closet". On June 10, 2021, it was announced Big Mama would be reuniting to release new music.

As of 2022, the group currently released six studio albums, two cover albums and 16 singles.

Members 
 Shin Yona (신연아, 申然雅)
 Lee Young-hyun (이영현)
 Lee Ji-young (이지영)
 Park Min-hye (박민혜)

Discography

Studio albums

Cover albums

Singles

Awards and nominations

References 

South Korean contemporary R&B musical groups
K-pop music groups
South Korean girl groups
Musical groups established in 2003
Musical groups disestablished in 2012
Musical groups reestablished in 2021
2003 establishments in South Korea
2012 disestablishments in South Korea
MAMA Award winners